Eduardo Augusto Cameselle Machado (born 2 March 1990), commonly known as Edu, is a Portuguese footballer who plays as a midfielder for Grupo Futebol Clube Pousa.

Club career
Born in Barcelos, Braga District, Edu began his career at hometown club Gil Vicente F.C. and had two years in the ranks of S.L. Benfica before joining S.C. Braga in 2006. He never made a first-team appearance, and competed in the lower divisions before joining Segunda Liga side C.D. Trofense in July 2012.

Edu made his professional league debut on 12 August 2012, featuring the full 90 minutes of a 2–0 away loss against C.D. Aves in the first matchday. He played two further league games off the bench, and as many in the Taça da Liga.

Personal life
Edu was the nephew of former Portugal international Dito.

References

External links

National team data 

1990 births
Living people
People from Barcelos, Portugal
Portuguese footballers
Association football midfielders
Liga Portugal 2 players
Segunda Divisão players
Gil Vicente F.C. players
S.C. Braga players
C.F. Estrela da Amadora players
F.C. Vizela players
SC Mirandela players
C.F. Fão players
C.D. Trofense players
Portugal youth international footballers
Sportspeople from Braga District